Todd Woodbridge and Mark Woodforde were the defending champions, but Woodbridge did not compete this year. Woodforde teamed up with Jason Stoltenberg and lost in the first round to tournament winners Andre Agassi and Petr Korda.

Agassi and Korda, who entered the tournament as wild cards, won the title by defeating Stefan Edberg and Henrik Holm 7–6, 6–4 in the final.

Seeds
The first four seeds received a bye to the second round.

Draw

Finals

Top half

Bottom half

Qualifying

Qualifying seeds

Qualifiers

Qualifying draw

First qualifier

Second qualifier

References

External links
 Official results archive (ATP)
 Official results archive (ITF)

Doubles